Black Firs Wood Nature Reserve is a  nature reserve managed by the Cheshire Wildlife Trust.  It is located at Black Firs Lane, Somerford, near Congleton, Cheshire, England,.

Description
An oak-dominated woodland with a series of marl pits throughout, this reserve can be accessed from a public footpath.  A pathway runs the entire length of the wood, leading to a roadway at the far end from which Hogswood Covert can be seen and accessed.

Notes

References 

Nature reserves in Cheshire
Cheshire Wildlife Trust reserves